Phyllidiopsis shireenae is a species of sea slug, a dorid nudibranch, a shell-less marine gastropod mollusk in the family Phyllidiidae.

References

 Brunckhorst, D.J. (1993) The systematics and phylogeny of Phyllidiid Nudibranchs (Doridoidea). Records of the Australian Museum, Supplement 16: 1-107.

External links
 
 http://www.seaslugforum.net/find/phylshir
 http://www.seaslugforum.net/brbrun1.htm

Phyllidiidae
Gastropods described in 1990